Manuela Arcuri (born 8 January 1977, in Anagni) is an Italian actress, model and soubrette. She was the protagonist of two successful TV series, L'onore e il rispetto and Il peccato e la vergogna.

Biography
Arcuri was born in Anagni, near Frosinone, to a father from the Province of Crotone and a mother from Avellino. Raised in Latina, Lazio from an early age, Manuela Arcuri, was often on the covers of tabloids. She has a black belt in karate. She was an attendee at former prime minister Silvio Berlusconi's private parties.

TV career

At a very early age she was attracted to show business, and she became a fashion model; in 1995 she played parts in soap operas and in her first film, Black Holes directed by Pappi Corsicato; then she had a supporting role in The Graduates directed by Leonardo Pieraccioni, and a major one in the comedy film Bagnomaria by Giorgio Panariello, which brought her to the attention of the moviegoing public. She continued acting in other movies and stage productions, such as A Pretty Story of a Woman e Liolà at the side of Gianfranco Jannuzzo and under the direction of Gigi Proietti.

In 2000 Manuela Arcuri, now considered a sex symbol, appeared in a calendar for the magazine GenteViaggi; the following year, she posed for another calendar, this time for the magazine Panorama, obtaining great success that consolidated her reputation and helped her land a role in the TV series Carabinieri.  In 2001 she hosted the TV show Mai dire Gol with Gialappa's Band. In 2002, she co-hosted the Sanremo Music Festival alongside Pippo Baudo and Vittoria Belvedere. In 2003, she co-hosted with Teo Teocoli and Anna Maria Barbera the eighth series of the TV comedy show Scherzi a parte.

Theatre
Liolà (2006)
Il primo che mi capita (2008)
A Pretty Story of Woman (2010)

Filmography

Television

References

External links

 Official website
 
 
 

1977 births
Living people
Accademia Nazionale di Arte Drammatica Silvio D'Amico alumni
Italian actresses
Italian female models
People from Latina, Lazio
People of Calabrian descent